Dark Woods is a 2003 Norwegian thriller/horror film directed by . The tagline—""—translates to "They should've stayed away from that lake".

The film received two nominations for the Amanda award in the categories of best Norwegian film and best male actor (Kristoffer Joner), though it did not win in any of the categories.

A sequel, was released in October 2015.

Plot

The broadcasting company Real TV plan to head into the woods to film a reality TV series where contestants try to survive in the wilderness without aid for four days. Before the filming, in an effort to create bonds between the members of Real TV's production team, Gunnar—the boss—decides that they should try the experience for themselves.

Production
Dark Woods, being 's first full-length film, was recorded over the course of 24 days in September 2002 in Kaupanger, Sogn. The film cost approximately 10 million Norwegian kroner to make.

Release
Dark Woods was pre-screened to friends of the director in Stavanger ahead of the theatrical release—21 February 2003. Entertainment, with plans for Blu-ray in 2015.

Reception

The German TV Spielfilm described the film as "creepier than real reality TV", commending the film's atmosphere, characters and scares. Birger Vestmo of  likewise praised the atmosphere of the film, in addition to the actors' performance, noting that they actually seem scared, and that their dialogue appeared natural. Conversely, he felt the story lacking, remarking that the film started to become boring halfway through, with the characters wandering aimlessly through the woods.

In a survey conducted in October 2008 by Dagbladet to commemorate the theatrical premiere of the horror film Cold Prey 2, readers were asked to select the "scariest Norwegian horror movie". Dark Woods won with 41% of the vote, outcompeting Cold Prey's 32% and Lake of the Dead's 21%.

Legacy
In later retrospectives of the "horror boom" in Norwegian film, characterised by the use of natural environments like mountains and forests, Dark Woods has been seen as instrumental in its genesis.

References

External links 
 
 Dark Woods at 

2003 films
2003 horror films
Norwegian horror films
2000s Norwegian-language films
Norwegian slasher films
2000s slasher films